Syntax tree may refer to:

 Abstract syntax tree, used in computer science
 Concrete syntax tree, used in linguistics